Day Middle School may refer to the following schools:
Frank A. Day Middle School in the Newton Public Schools district in Newton, Massachusetts
James L. Day Middle School in the Temecula Valley Unified School District in Temecula, California